The Americas Zone was one of the three zones of the regional Davis Cup competition in 1992.

In the Americas Zone there were three different tiers, called groups, in which teams compete against each other to advance to the upper tier. Winners in Group II advanced to the Americas Zone Group I. Teams who lost their respective ties competed in the relegation play-offs, with winning teams remaining in Group II, whereas teams who lost their play-offs were relegated to the Americas Zone Group III in 1993.

Participating nations

Draw

 and  relegated to Group III in 1993.
 promoted to Group I in 1993.

First round

Ecuador vs. Peru

Eastern Caribbean vs. Bahamas

Venezuela vs. Dominican Republic

Colombia vs. Barbados

Second round

Bahamas vs. Peru

Colombia vs. Venezuela

Relegation play-offs

Eastern Caribbean vs. Ecuador

Dominican Republic vs. Barbados

Third round

Venezuela vs. Bahamas

References

External links
Davis Cup official website

Davis Cup Americas Zone
Americas Zone Group II